Creston Community School District is a public school district headquartered in Creston, Iowa.

The district is in sections of Adams and Union counties, with a very small section in Ringgold County. It serves Creston and Prescott.

, it had about 1,400 students. Also there are 114,59 teachers. With 89.3% of white students, 5.0% Hispanic/Latino, 3.1% two or more races, 1.5% Black or African American, 0.7% Asian or Asian Pacific

Islander, 0.3% American Indian or Alaska Native and 0.2% Native Hawaiian or Other Pacific Islander.

History

On July 1, 2016, the Prescott Community School District merged into the Creston district. The election determining whether the districts would consolidate was held Tuesday April 7, 2015.

In 2019, the district announced plans to replace buses without seat belts with buses that have seat belts.

Schools
 Creston Community High School (CCHS)
 Creston Community Middle School
 Creston Community Elementary School
 Creston Community Early Childhood Centre (ECC)

The elementary and middle school occupy two separate buildings in the same campus, while the high school has its own campus. The Burton R. Jones Education Centre has the district headquarters, Head Start centre, preschool, alternative school, and the headquarters of the Green Hills Area Education Agency.

Creston Community High School

Athletics
The Panthers compete in the Hawkeye 10 Conference in the following sports:

Fall Sports
Cross Country 
Football
Volleyball

Winter Sports
Basketball 
 Boys' 2-time State Champions (1939, 1997)
Bowling
Wrestling
 2-time State Champions (2007, 2016 (as Creston-Orient Macksburg)) 
 2007 Class 2A State Duals Champions (as Creston-Orient Macksburg)

Spring Sports
Golf 
 Boys' 2013 Class 3A State Champions (as Creston-Orient Macksburg)
 Girls' 1969 State Champions
Soccer 
Tennis 
Track and Field

Summer Sports
Baseball
Softball

See also
List of school districts in Iowa
List of high schools in Iowa

References

External links
 Creston Community School District

School districts in Iowa
Education in Adams County, Iowa
Education in Ringgold County, Iowa
Education in Union County, Iowa